The 1990 Cornell Big Red football team represented Cornell University in the 1990 NCAA Division I-AA football season as a member of the Ivy League. The Big Red were led by first-year head coach Jim Hofher and played their home games at Schoellkopf Field. The Big Red finished the season 7–3 overall and 6–1 in Ivy League play to win Cornell's third Ivy League championship, sharing the title with Dartmouth.

Schedule

References

Cornell
Cornell Big Red football seasons
Ivy League football champion seasons
Cornell Big Red football